Bishop's slender opossum (Marmosops bishopi) is a small, arboreal marsupial opossum native to Brazil, Peru, and Bolivia. It somewhat resembles a placental rat or shrew.

References

Further reading
 
 

Opossums
Mammals described in 1981